The S1 service of the S-Bahn Rhein-Main system bearing the KBS (German scheduled railway route) number 645.1 is an important railway connection running east–west. It operates between the Hesse state capital Wiesbaden and the southern Offenbach rural district serving the densely populated area along the Main river.

Usually DBAG Class 423 railcars are used on this service. Its predecessor class 420 is only used for shortened shuttle services.

Routes

Taunus railway 

The western branch of the service starts at the central station of Wiesbaden and utilises the oldest railway route of the Rhine-Main area running between Mainz-Kastel and Frankfurt-Höchst parallel to the Main and the Taunus mountains from which the railway line derived its name. The service uses the existing double track route together with national, regional, and freight transportation. It serves eight stations. The Taunus Railway was opened in stages between 26 September 1839 and 19 May 1840 and has been used by S-Bahn services since 1978.

Main-Lahn railway 

Between Farbwerke and Frankfurt-Griesheim this service shares the Main-Lahn line with freight and shunting operations. National and regional services use the parallel running Taunus railway in this section.  The Main-Lahn railway was completed on 15 October 1877 and has been used by S-Bahn services since 1978.

City tunnel 

The city tunnel is an underground, pure S-Bahn route used by almost all services (except for the S7 service which terminates at the central station). The tunnel was opened in four stages in 1978, 1983, 1990 and 1992. In a short section between Mühlberg and Offenbach-Kaiserlei the South Main railway is used. The section from Mühlberg to Offenbach Ost through the Offenbach City Tunnel was opened in 1995.

Rodgau railway 

This line was opened in 1896 and has been used since 2003 only by S-Bahn services.

History 

The S1 was one of the first six services of the Rhine-Main S-Bahn system. In a prior test operation it ran between Wiesbaden Central Station and Frankfurt Central Station. The service was then called R1 where the letter "R" stands for regional. After the opening of the Frankfurt Citytunnel the service was renamed to S1 and extended to the new Hauptwache underground station. Further extensions of the tunnel followed in 1983 (Konstablerwache) and 1990 (Ostendstraße and Lokalbahnhof) so that the Südbahnhof (South station) became the service's eastern terminal. In 1992 the eastern branch of the Citytunnel to the Mühlberg station was opened and the S1 started operation in this section shutting down its service to Lokalbahnhof and Südbahnhof. With the opening of the Offenbach Citytunnel, the service was extended eastwards to the station Offenbach Ost (Offenbach East).

In 2003 the Rodgau railway was included. After two years of construction work this route was changed to S-Bahn operation. Since then the new eastern terminal station is Rödermark-Ober-Roden.

Operation 
 Wiesbaden – Rödermark-Ober-Roden
 Hochheim – Rödermark-Ober-Roden
 Hochheim – Offenbach-Ost
 Hattersheim – Frankfurt Hbf (Shuttle service)
 Frankfurt-Höchst – Rödermark-Oberroden
 Frankfurt-Höchst – Offenbach-Ost
 Frankfurt-Höchst – Frankfurt Hbf (Shuttle service)

References

External links 

 traffiQ Frankfurt – S1 timetable

Rhine-Main S-Bahn